Johnny B. Washington (born April 20, 1930) played for the Chicago American Giants and the Houston Eagles in baseball's Negro league.

Washington was born in Chicago and attended that city's Morgan Park High School, graduating in 1949.

In 1951 Washington joined the U.S. Marine Corps, serving in Korea. He played on the Marine's national championship baseball team in 1952.

References 

Chicago American Giants players
Houston Eagles players
1930 births
Living people
United States Marines
21st-century African-American people